Chesneau is a French surname. Notable people with the surname include:

 César Chesneau Dumarsais (1676–1756), French philosophe and grammarian
 Didier Chesneau (active from 1994), French guitarist, composer, sound engineer and director
 Jean Chesneau, French writer and secretary to the French ambassador to the Ottoman Empire
 Michel Chesneau (before 1770 – after 1805), French naval officer who fought at the Battle of Trafalgar
 Olivier Chesneau (1972–2014), French astronomer
 Roger Chesneau (born 1925), French steeplechaser who competed in the 1948 Summer Olympics

See also 
 (6065) Chesneau, a main-belt minor planet
 

French-language surnames